The 1993 Missouri Valley Conference men's basketball tournament was played after the conclusion of the 1992–1993 regular season at the St. Louis Arena in St. Louis, Missouri.

The Southern Illinois Salukis defeated the Illinois State Redbirds in the championship game, 70-59, and as result won their 2nd MVC Tournament title and earned an automatic bid to the 1993 NCAA tournament. Ashraf Amaya of Southern Illinois was named the tournament MVP.

Bracket

References

1992–93 Missouri Valley Conference men's basketball season
Missouri Valley Conference men's basketball tournament
Missouri Valley Conference men's basketball tournament
College basketball tournaments in Missouri
Basketball competitions in St. Louis